Norman Francis Hodgins Jr. (born March 1, 1952) is a former professional American football player. He played in the National Football League (NFL) as a defensive back for the Chicago Bears for one season, in 1974. He played in 14 games that season and had three fumble recoveries. He played college football at Louisiana State University, where he was a wide receiver for the LSU Tigers football team and scored one touchdown in 1973.

Hodgins was born in New Orleans and attended Archbishop Rummel High School.

References

Living people
1952 births
Archbishop Rummel High School alumni
Players of American football from New Orleans
LSU Tigers football players
Chicago Bears players
American football defensive backs
American football wide receivers